V is an energy drink brand produced by Frucor, a New Zealand-based beverage manufacturer. It was launched in Methven, New Zealand in August 1997 and in Australia in 1999. The product's success, a market share over 60% in New Zealand and 42% in Australia, makes it the most popular brand of energy drink in both countries. V is considered a local rival to Red Bull. Frucor says V energy drinks are not intended for children, and they are not recommended for pregnant women or people sensitive to caffeine.

Variants 
V Energy (also referred to as "V Green") is the original flavour of V released in 1997.

Blue (also referred to as "V Blue") is a "mysterious" flavour introduced in October 2011 which V challenges the drinker to try and work out the flavour.

V Pure is a flavour alternative released in 2016 coming from 6 Natural Ingredients; apple juice, sparkling water, lemon juice, Guarana seed extract, caffeine from green coffee beans and natural V flavour.

V added a second Sugar Free flavour in 2018, themed after summer and the tropics. This product replaced V Zero.

V Tortured Orchard Raspberry Lemonade was introduced in 2018.

V Energy Shots 
The energy shots (described as "Pocket Rockets") are claimed to be as effective as the larger cans but have an extremely bitter taste that, according to the V Pocket Rocket website, is to stop young children from drinking them.

V Iced Drinks 
In 2018, V released 2 Iced Coffee and 2 Iced Chocolate drinks to the New Zealand and Australian Market.

Advertisement and promotions
The drink sponsored I'm a Celebrity...Get Me Out of Here! in the UK for its second series in 2003.

In April 2018, V together with donut store chain Donut King released in Australia a V flavoured donut. The donut was sold through Donut King stores nationwide and contained a gooey Guarana filling and covered in green sugar crystals.

V sponsored Back of the Y Masterpiece Television in the mid 2000s.

References

External links
 Australia production of V
 New Zealand production of V

Energy drinks
Products introduced in 1997
New Zealand drinks
New Zealand brands
Suntory